Higuita is an upcoming Indian Malayalam-language political drama film directed by Hemanth G Nair and produced by Bobby Tharian & Sajith Amma. It stars Suraj Venjaramoodu in the title role with an ensemble cast including Dhyan Sreenivasan, Manoj K. Jayan, Indrans, Abu Salim, Vineeth Kumar.

The film title was contested by N. S. Madhavan, who claimed that the film title had denied him a right to a film title based on his short story of the same name. It will be released on 31 March 2023.

Plot
Left-wing firebrand leader Pannyannoor Mukundhan forged in the crucible of left-wing politics of Malabar, always facing threats of violence and even murder.

Ayyapa Das recently joined in the police and is assigned as his gunman. Das's father was a civil police officer, who died while still in service. Impending financial disaster for the family forces Das to take up this responsibility and go for a police job.

Higuita is a tale of contradicting individuals working close to each other and the inherent conflict of the situation.

Cast

Music
Rahul Raj was signed in 2020 to compose the film score and songs. However as the film got pushed to 2022, Rahul Raj composed the songs and opted out of composing the film's background score due to scheduling conflicts. Dawn Vincent was then brought in to compose the background score.

References

 Higuita Movie: Showtimes, Review, Trailer, Posters, News & Videos | eTimes @TimesofIndia
 Higuita | പേരു മാറില്ല 'ഹിഗ്വിറ്റ'; ചിത്രത്തിന്‍റെ സെൻസറിങ് കഴിഞ്ഞു; റിലീസ് ജനുവരിയിൽ @News18 Malayalam
 മാസ് ഡയലോ​ഗുമായി സുരാജ്, വിവാദങ്ങളിൽ തളരാതെ 'ഹിഗ്വിറ്റ'; ടീസർ പുറത്ത് @Times of India(Samyam)
  @filmibeat
 Film Chamber fails to solve row over title of ‘Higuita’; legal battle likely @onmanorama
 Film title ‘Higuita’ triggers controversy - The New Indian Express @newindianexpress
 Won't back away, will fight legally, says 'Higuita' director @mathrubhumi
 Higuita Malayalam Movie Trailer, Higuita Malayalam Movie Song @thrissurkerala 
 Malayalam Film Higuita's Title Controversy to Now be Settled in Court? What We Know @news18
 Higuita Movie update film chamber banned movie name team will proceed with legal proceedings | Higuita Movie: ഹി​ഗ്വിറ്റയ്ക്ക് വിലക്ക്; പേര് മാറ്റില്ല, നിയമനടപടികളുമായി മുന്നോട്ടെന്ന് സംവിധായകൻ | Movies News in Malayalam @zeenews
 The ‘Higuita’ row that has left Kerala film & literature enthusiasts divided @thenewsminute
 Higuita Movie Teaser Is Out @b4blaze
 വിലക്കുമായി ഫിലിം ചേംബർ, പേര് മാറ്റില്ലെന്ന് സംവിധായകൻ; ചർച്ച പരാജയം, ഹിഗ്വിറ്റ വിവാദം കോടതി കയറുന്നു @asianetnews
 After writer’s complaint, Kerala Film Chamber of Commerce denies title of ‘Higuita’ for a movie @thehindu
 How Colombian footballer René Higuita’s name ignited a cultural debate in Kerala @indianexpress
 Higuita on Moviebuff.com @moviebuff
 വിവാദങ്ങളിൽ തളരാതെ ‘ഹിഗ്വിറ്റ’: ടീസർ പുറത്ത് | East Coast Daily Malayalam @eastcoastdaily

External links

Upcoming Malayalam-language films
Films shot in Thalassery
Films shot in Kannur